Tropical Campfires, originally known as Tropical Campfire's, is an album by Michael Nesmith released in 1992 after Nesmith's 13-year hiatus from making studio albums. It is the 9th and final Nesmith album to feature guitarist Red Rhodes, who died in 1995.

Allmusic writes that "Along with Lindsey Buckingham's Out of the Cradle, this album may be one of the finest and most underrated albums of the 1990s."

The seemingly incorrect original spelling of the album's title comes from an excerpt printed inside the CD booklet: "Now she must navigate by the southwestern tropical campfire's mambo raga songs, their sounds rising from the desert floor ..."  The original 1992 CD on Pacific Arts reads "campfire's" but the 2001 and 2008 reissues have the apostrophe missing from the cover artwork.

All versions of this album were released encoded in the Dolby Digital Pro-Logic surround sound format.

Track listing
All songs written by Michael Nesmith except where otherwise noted.
 "Yellow Butterfly" – 5:22
 "Laugh Kills Lonesome" – 4:12
 "Moon Over the Rio Grande" – 5:58
 "One...	" – 5:19
 "Juliana" – 6:09
 "Brazil" (Bob Russell, Ary Barroso, Russell Sidney) – 5:35
 "In the Still of the Night" (Cole Porter) – 3:09
 "Rising in Love" – 4:42
 "Begin the Beguine" (Cole Porter) – 5:18
 "I Am Not That" – 2:45
 "...for the Island" – 5:18
 "Twilight on the Trail" – 4:28

Personnel
Michael Nesmith – guitar, vocals, liner notes
Joe Chemay – bass, background vocals
John Jorgenson – guitar, mandolin, background vocals
John Hobbs – keyboards, background vocals
Red Rhodes – guitar, pedal steel guitar
Luis Conte – percussion
 Nelson Stump - cowbell
Robbie Sneddon - percussion, harp
Production notes
Michael Nesmith – producer
Mike McDonald – engineer
Peter Rynston – mastering
Jeff Adamoff – art direction
Henry Diltz – photography
Val Jennings – project coordinator
Jeff Lancaster – design
Stan Watts – illustrations

References

1992 albums
Michael Nesmith albums